
Tianqiao may refer to the following places in China:

Tianqiao District, a district of Jinan, Shandong

Anhui
Tianqiao Subdistrict, Bengbu, in Bengshan District, Bengbu
Tianqiao Township, Anhui (田桥乡), in Linquan County

Guizhou
Tianqiao, Fenggang County (天桥), a town in Fenggang County
Tianqiao Tujia and Miao Ethnic Township (天桥土家族苗族乡), in Sinan County, Guizhou

Other provinces
Tianqiao Subdistrict, Beijing (天桥街道), in Xicheng District, Beijing
Tianqiao, Hebei (天桥), a town in Fengning Manchu Autonomous County, Hebei
Tianqiao Subdistrict, Jinzhou (天桥街道), in Taihe District, Jinzhou, Liaoning
Tianqiao, Juye County (田桥), a town in Juye County, Shandong